R. Brunstone was the founder of the Scouting movement in the Malaysian state of Melaka, at Malacca in 1926, and cofounder in the state of Negeri Sembilan, also in 1926.

Scouting pioneers
Year of birth missing
Scouting and Guiding in Malaysia
Place of birth missing
Place of death missing
Year of death missing